Mtaa may refer to:
 Mtaa (settlement)
 (Methyl-Co(III) methanol-specific corrinoid protein):coenzyme M methyltransferase, an enzyme
 M.River & T.Whid Art Associates